Raypur Union is a union parishad of Jibannagar Upazila, in Chuadanga District, Khulna Division of Bangladesh. There are 8 villages and 7 mouzas in the union.

References

External links
 

Unions of Khulna Division
Unions of Chuadanga District
Unions of Jibannagar Upazila